Plants of the World Online recognizes about 143 accepted species in the plant genus Castanopsis of the beech family Fagaceae. Individual species are described in detail on www.asianfagaceae.com.

A 

 Castanopsis acuminatissima (Blume) A. DC. (= Castanea acuminatissima Blume, Quercus junghuhnii Miq.) – Bangladesh to Indochina, south-central China, Malesia, and Papuasia.
 Castanopsis amabilis W.C.Cheng & C.S.Chao – China (southwest Guangxi)
 Castanopsis annamensis Hickel & A.Camus – Vietnam and south-central China
 Castanopsis argentea (Blume) A. DC. (= Castanea argentea (Blume) Blume) – India, Myanmar, Thailand, Sumatra, Borneo, and Java
 Castanopsis argyrophylla King ex Hook. f. – Bangladesh and Indochina to China (southern Yunnan)
 Castanopsis arietina Hickel & A.Camus – Vietnam
 Castanopsis armata (Roxb.) Spach – Arunachal Pradesh and Bangladesh to Indochina

B 
 Castanopsis birmanica A.Camus – Myanmar
 Castanopsis boisii Hickel & A.Camus –  China (Guangdong, Guangxi, Yunnan, and Hainan) and Vietnam
 Castanopsis borneensis King – Borneo
 Castanopsis brevispinula Hickel & A.Camus – northern Thailand and Laos
 Castanopsis buruana Miq. – northern Borneo, Sulawesi, Maluku

C 

 Castanopsis calathiformis (Skan) Rehder & E.H.Wilson – Assam to Indochina and China (Yunnan)
 Castanopsis cambodiana A.Chev. Cambodia
 Castanopsis carlesii (Hemsl.) Hayata (= Quercus carlesii Hemsl.) – southern China, Taiwan, and Vietnam
 Castanopsis castanicarpa (Roxb.) Spach Bangladesh and Myanmar
 Castanopsis catappifolia King ex Hook.f. – Peninsular Malaysia
 Castanopsis ceratacantha Rehder & E.H.Wilson – Indochina and south-central China
 Castanopsis cerebrina (Hickel & A.Camus) Barnett – south-central China and northern Indochina
 Castanopsis chapaensis Luong – Vietnam
 Castanopsis chevalieri Hickel & A.Camus – Vietnam
 Castanopsis chinensis (Spreng.) Hance – southern China, southern Taiwan, Vietnam
 Castanopsis choboensis Hickel & A.Camus – China (Yunnan, Guizhou, Guangxi) and Vietnam
 Castanopsis chunii W.C.Cheng – southern China
 Castanopsis clarkei King ex Hook f. – Bhutan to Indochina
 Castanopsis clemensii Soepadmo – Borneo (Sabah)
 Castanopsis concinna (Champ. ex Benth.) A.DC. – China (Guangdong, Guangxi, Hong Kong)
 Castanopsis costata (Blume) A.DC. – Thailand and western Malesia
 Castanopsis crassifolia Hickel & A.Camus – China (Guangxi) and Indochina
 Castanopsis cryptoneuron (H.Lév.) A.Camus – China (Yunnan)
 Castanopsis curtisii King – Peninsular Malaysia
 Castanopsis cuspidata (Thunb.) Schottky – South Korea (Jeju) and southern and central Japan

D 

 Castanopsis delavayi Franch. – southern China
 Castanopsis densinervia Soepadmo – northern Borneo
 Castanopsis densispinosa Y.C.Hsu & H.Wei Jen – China (Yunnan)
 Castanopsis diversifolia (Kurz) King ex Hook. f. (= Castanea diversifolia Kurz) – Indochina and China (Yunnan)
 Castanopsis dongchoenensis Hickel & A.Camus – Vietnam
 Castanopsis dongnaiensis Son & Ngoc – Vietnam

E 

 Castanopsis echinocarpa Miq. – Nepal to Indochina and southern China
 Castanopsis echinophora A.Camus – Vietnam
 Castanopsis endertii Hatus. ex Soepadmo – Borneo
 Castanopsis evansii Elmer – northern and eastern Borneo, Philippines (Palawan)
 Castanopsis eyrei (Champ. ex Benth.) Tutcher (= Castanopsis caudata Franch., Quercus eyrei Champ. ex Benth.) – southern China and Taiwan

F 

 Castanopsis faberi Hance (= Castanopsis stellatospina Hayata) – south-central and southeastern China, Taiwan, and Vietnam
 Castanopsis fargesii Franch. (= Castanopsis taiwaniana Hayata) – southern China and Taiwan
 Castanopsis ferox (Roxb.) Spach – Sikkim to Indochina and China (Yunnan)
 Castanopsis fissa (Champ. ex Benth.) Rehder & E.H.Wilson – southeastern China to Indochina
 Castanopsis fleuryi Hickel & A.Camus – Laos, China (Yunnan)
 Castanopsis fordii Hance – southern China and northern Thailand
 Castanopsis foxworthyi Schottky – Peninsular Malaysia and western Borneo
 Castanopsis fulva Gamble – Peninsular Malaysia, Sumatra, and Borneo

G 

 Castanopsis gamblei Hickel & A.Camus – Laos to northwestern Vietnam
 Castanopsis glabra Merr. – Philippines (Leyte)
 Castanopsis glabrifolia J.Q.Li & Li Chen – Hainan
 Castanopsis grandicicatricata N.H.Xia & D.H.Vuong – Vietnam
 Castanopsis griffithii A.Camus – Myanmar
 Castanopsis guinieri A.Camus – Vietnam

H 

 Castanopsis hainanensis Merr. – Hainan
 Castanopsis harmandii  – Laos
 Castanopsis hsiensiui  J.Q.Li & Li Chen – Hainan
 Castanopsis hupehensis C.S.Chao – China (Guizhou, Hunan, Sichuan, Hubei)
 Castanopsis hypophoenicea (Seemen) Soepadmo – Borneo

I 

 Castanopsis indica (Roxb. ex Lindl.) A. DC. – Nepal to Indochina, southern China, and Taiwan
 Castanopsis inermis (Lindl.) Benth. & Hook. f. (= Callaeocarpus sumatrana Miq., Castanea inermis Lindl., Castanopsis sumatrana (Miq.) A. DC.) – Myanmar, Thailand, Peninsular Malaysia, Sumatra, and Philippines

J 

 Castanopsis javanica (Blume) A. DC. (= Castanea javanica (Blume) Blume, Fagus javanica Blume, Quercus discocarpa Hance, Quercus javanica (Blume) Drake) – Thailand, Peninsular Malaysia, Sumatra, Borneo, Java
 Castanopsis jianfenglingensis Duanmu – Hainan
 Castanopsis jinpingensis J.Q.Li & Li Chen – China (Yunnan)
 Castanopsis johorensis Soepadmo – Peninsular Malaysia (Johor)
 Castanopsis jucunda Hance – southern China

J 

 Castanopsis kawakamii Hayata – southeastern China, Taiwan, Vietnam
 Castanopsis kweichowensis Hu – China (Guizhou, Guangxi)

L 

 Castanopsis lamontii Hance – southern China and Vietnam
 Castanopsis lanceifolia (Oerst.) Hickel & A. Camus – Nepal to Indochina
 Castanopsis lecomtei Hickel & A.Camus – Vietnam
 Castanopsis longipes A.Camus – Vietnam
 Castanopsis longipetiolata Hickel & A.Camus – Vietnam
 Castanopsis longispina (King ex Hook.f.) C.C.Huang & Y.T.Zhang – eastern Himalayas and Tibet
 Castanopsis lucida (Nees) Soepadmo – Peninsular Malaysia, Borneo

M 

 Castanopsis malaccensis Gamble – Peninsular Thailand, Peninsular Malaysia, Sumatra
 Castanopsis malipoensis C.C.Huang ex J.Q.Li & Li Chen – China (Yunnan)
 Castanopsis megacarpa Gamble – Peninsular Thailand, Peninsular Malaysia, Borneo
 Castanopsis mekongensis A.Camus – China (Yunnan), Laos, and Vietnam
 Castanopsis microphylla Soepadmo – Borneo
 Castanopsis motleyana King – Borneo, Philippines
 Castanopsis multiporcata N.H.Xia & D.H.Vuong – Vietnam

N 

 Castanopsis namdinhensis Hickel & A.Camus – Vietnam, Laos, and Cambodia
 Castanopsis neocavaleriei A.Camus – China (Guizhou)
 Castanopsis nephelioides King ex Hook f. – Thailand and Peninsular Malaysia
 Castanopsis nhatrangensis Hickel & A.Camus – Vietnam
 Castanopsis ninhhoensis Hickel & A.Camus – Vietnam

O 

 Castanopsis oblonga Y.C.Hsu & H.Wei Jen – China (Yunnan)
 Castanopsis oliefera G.A.Fu – Hainan
 Castanopsis oligoneura Soepadmo – Borneo (Sabah)
 Castanopsis orthacantha Franch. – China (Yunnan)
 Castanopsis ouonbiensis Hickel & A.Camus – China (southeastern and Yunnan) and Vietnam
 Castanopsis oviformis Soepadmo – Borneo

P 

 Castanopsis pathakii Shankh.Mitra, Ranjan & D.Maity – Arunachal Pradesh
 Castanopsis paucispina Soepadmo – western Borneo
 Castanopsis pedunculata Soepadmo – northern Borneo
 Castanopsis philipensis (Blanco) S. Vidal (= Fagus philipensis Blanco) – Philippines
 Castanopsis phuthoensis Luong – Vietnam
 Castanopsis pierrei Hance – Cambodia and Thailand
 Castanopsis piriformis Hickel & A.Camus – Thailand, Laos, Cambodia, and Vietnam
 Castanopsis platyacantha Rehder & E.H.Wilson – China (Guizhou, Sichuan, Yunnan)
 Castanopsis poilanei Hickel & A.Camus – Vietnam
 Castanopsis pseudohystrix Phengklai – Thailand
 Castanopsis psilophylla Soepadmo – Borneo, Philippines (Palawan)
 Castanopsis purpurea Barnett – Thailand
 Castanopsis purpurella (Miq.) N.P.Balakr. – Nepal to northern Indochina, southern China, and Taiwan
 Castanopsis purpurella subsp. laotica (Hickel & A.Camus) Govaerts – Laos
 Castanopsis purpurella subsp. purpurella (= Castanopsis hystrix Miq.) – Nepal to northern Indochina, southern China, and Taiwan

Q 

 Castanopsis qiongbeiensis G.A.Fu – Hainan

R 

 Castanopsis remotidenticulata Hu – China (Yunnan)
 Castanopsis rhamnifolia (Miq.) A.DC. – Myanmar, Thailand, Peninsular Malaysia, Sumatra
 Castanopsis ridleyi Gamble – Peninsular Malaysia
 Castanopsis rockii A.Camus – China (Yunnan) and northern Indochina
 Castanopsis rufotomentosa Hu – China (Yunnan)

S 

 Castanopsis schefferiana Hance – Thailand, Peninsular Malaysia, and northeastern Sumatra
 Castanopsis sclerophylla (Lindl. & Paxton) Schottky (= Quercus chinensis C. Abel, Quercus sclerophylla Lindl. & Paxton) – southern China
 Castanopsis scortechinii Gamble – Peninsular Malaysia
 Castanopsis selangorensis A.Camus – Peninsular Malaysia
 Castanopsis semifabri X.M.Chen & B.P.Yu – Hainan
 Castanopsis siamensis Duanmu – northern Thailand
 Castanopsis sieboldii (Makino) Hatus. (= Castanopsis cuspidata var. sieboldii (Makino) Nakai, Pasania cuspidata var. sieboldii Makino) – South Korea, central and southern Japan, Ryukyu Islands
 Castanopsis symmetricupulata Luong – Vietnam

T 

 Castanopsis tcheponensis Hickel & A.Camus – China (Yunnan), Vietnam, Laos, and Myanmar
 Castanopsis tessellata Hickel & A. Camus – China (Yunnan), Vietnam, and Laos
 Castanopsis thaiensis Phengklai – northern Thailand
 Castanopsis tibetana Hance – Tibet and southern China
 Castanopsis tonkinensis Seemen – southern China, Hainan, and Vietnam
 Castanopsis torulosa Hickel & A. Camus – Vietnam
 Castanopsis touranensis Hickel & A. Camus – Vietnam
 Castanopsis tranninhensis Hickel & A. Camus – Laos
 Castanopsis tribuloides (Sm.) A. DC. (= Quercus tribuloides Sm.) – west-central Himalayas to Indochina and south-central China
 Castanopsis trichocarpa G.A.Fu – Hainan
 Castanopsis trinervis (H.Lév.) A.Camus – China (Guizhou)
 Castanopsis tungurrut (Blume) A. DC. (= Castanea tungurrut Blume) – Peninsular Malaysia, Sumatra, Java

U 

 Castanopsis undulatifolia G.A.Fu – Hainan

W 

 Castanopsis wallichii King ex Hook f. – Peninsular Thailand and Peninsular Malaysia
 Castanopsis wattii (King ex Hook.f.) A.Camus – Sikkim, Arunachal Pradesh, Tibet, China (Yunnan) 
 Castanopsis wenchangensis G.A.Fu & C.C.Huang – Hainan
 Castanopsis wilsonii Hickel & A.Camus – Vietnam
 Castanopsis wuzhishanensis G.A.Fu – Hainan

X 

 Castanopsis xichouensis C.C.Huang & Y.T.Chang – China (Yunnan)

References 

Castanopsis